Dushyant Pratap Singh (born 1 July 1977) is an Indian film director and screenwriter who mainly works in the Hindi cinema industry. Singh has directed actors like Daisy Shah, Rashmi Desai and Arshi Khan. Recently he directed the film Zindagi Shatranj Hai starring Hiten Tejwani.

Early life and career
Singh was born and raised in Agra, city of Uttar Pradesh, India. He completed his schooling from his hometown only before attending Dr. Bhimrao Ambedkar University. He started his career by directing the reality show titled by Dharm Ki Baat with Swami Chakrapani and others. Later he directed some music albums and then Feature Film The Hundred Bucks and TVc with Daisy Shah became the turning point for his directorial career and he earned films like Trahimam and Zindagi Shatranj Hai.

Filmography

Discography

TV commercial
 Indira Gas TVc with Daisy Shah

Awards
 Standard degree of Vidhavachaspati by Vikramshila Hindi Vidyapeeth
 Indo-Sri Lanka Bond Awards

References

External links
 
 
 https://timesofindia.indiatimes.com/topic/dushyant-pratap-singh

1977 births
Film directors from Uttar Pradesh
Living people
Hindi-language film directors
People from Lucknow
21st-century Indian film directors